Sultan Babullah Airport  also known as Ternate Airport, is located in the Indonesian province of North Maluku, close to the city of Ternate. The airport is named after the Indonesian warrior Sultan Babullah of Ternate (1528–1583). The airport serves as the main access to the province, with a high flow of both passengers and cargo. In the long run, government policy regarding air transport development plans will be aimed at the development of infrastructure and service at the airport, allowing for further routes to and from the city.

History
Sultan Babullah Airport was opened in 1971 but officially commenced operations for civilian aircraft in 1978, becoming the main form of transportation to North Maluku. The airport is located roughly 6 km from the city centre. In 2005, a terminal was inaugurated in order to accommodate the growing number of passengers. The airport set about further expansion in 2013, inaugurating a new and larger terminal while simultaneously expanding the runway.

Future planning

The airport is already making plans to extend its runway to 2,500m in order to accommodate planes such as the Boeing 737. Renovations to the apron are also expected to take place, and upon completion will be able to accommodate up to nine aircraft. Future plans are also in place to allow for larger wide-body planes such as the Boeing 747 to operate.

Facilities
The terminal is equipped with a bank, ATM machines, restaurants, bars, a VIP Lounge, duty-free shops, convenience stores, gift shops, travel agents, car rental, taxi service/rank. first aid services and much more.

Airlines and destinations

Passenger

Transportation to Ternate
There are many transport options to get from the airport to downtown Ternate:

Taxi
Airport taxis are usually stationed outside the airport terminal, charging roughly Rp 55,000 to get to the city. Motorcycle taxis can also be located outside the terminal, a cheaper option to get to the city, with fares roughly around Rp 15,000.

Bus
Minibuses to the city can be found at the nearby university, approximately ten minutes walk from the airport.

August 2007 riot
On August 22, 2007, the airport hosted a demonstration that led to more than 1,000 people rioting over gubernatorial elections. Several policemen and protesters were wounded, including four shot by police.

References

Ternate
 Airports in North Maluku